The European Federation of Chemical Engineering (EFCE), also known as Fédération Européenne du Génie Chimique and Europäische Föderation für Chemie-Ingenieur-Wesen, is an association of professional societies in Europe concerned with chemical engineering. 
It was formed in Paris on 20 June 1953 with 18 societies in 8 countries. India was the first non-European member in 1956 and Czechoslovakia the first Eastern European one in 1966.

As of November 2016, it has 38 member societies in 29 countries joining 162000 individual chemical engineers. (Some countries have more than one member society).  The EFCE passport programme allows members of one society some of the benefits of membership in other societies when travelling abroad, particularly for conferences.

It has a set of 20 Working Parties and 5 Sections comprising about 1000 industrial and academic experts on different subjects who meet to facilitate international cooperation and progress in their specialist areas.  The Working Party on Education has published documents on the Bologna process. The working party on Characterisation of particulate systems (ChOPS) is working closely with authorities and analyses the influence of particles in combination with challenges like the Dieselgate.

The Secretariat is jointly administered by IChemE (UK), DECHEMA e.V. (Germany) and Société Française de Génie des Procédés (France).  The current president (1 January 2018 –) is Dr Hermann J. Feise of BASF.

News of the EFCE are published in Chemical Engineering Research and Design.  Official meetings are usually held in association with the two series of European congresses known as ECCE  and CHISA .

Awards 

Since its beginning, the EFCE has established renowned awards to recognize scientific collaborations and support the work of engineering and scientists within the field of chemical engineering. Since 1999, the Federation presents its prestigious Medals, which include the Dieter Behrens Medal and the Jacques Villermaux Medal. The Dieter Behrens Medal is presented every four years in recognition of a significant contribution on behalf of the Federation in raising the profile of chemal engineering in Europe or in relation to the organization, management or development of EFCE's activity base. The Jacques Villermaux Medal is presented every four years to recognize scientific achievements within the context of the Federation's science policy, working parties, conference programme or other related activities. Further distinctions of the EFCE include the Lifetime Achievement Award and the Danckwerts Lecture. 

Apart from their medals and distinctions, the Federation has a series of Excellence Awards to recognize PhD thesis and publications of young researchers published in preceding years which demonstrate the most outstanding contribution to research and/or practice in the scientific fields of the EFCE Working Parties and Sections. The EFCE and its Working Parties have also established a series of Awards for long term/lifetime achievements to recognize an outstanding research career and achievements in their scientific fields and recent and industrial innovation. Finally the EFCE Student Mobility Award aims to promote mobility of European chemical engineering students. Launched in 2005, it is presented every two years to the best European students of chemical engineering who have studied successfully at least one semester in first or second cycle study programs in chemical engineering in each of two different countries.

References

Chemical engineering organizations
International scientific organizations based in Europe
Professional associations based in Europe
1953 establishments in France